Frans is an Afrikaans, Danish, Dutch, Finnish, Icelandic, Norwegian, and Swedish given name, sometimes as a short form of François. One cognate of Frans in English is Francis.

Given name
 Frans van Aarssens (1572–1641), Dutch diplomat and statesman
 Frans Ackerman (1330–1387), Flemish statesman
 Frans Adelaar (born 1960), Dutch football player and manager
 Frans Alphons Maria Alting von Geusau (born 1933), Dutch legal scholar and diplomat
 Frans Aerenhouts (born 1937), Belgian cyclist
 Frans Ananias (born 1972), Namibian footballer
 Frans Andersson (1911–1988), Danish bass-baritone
 Frans Andriessen (1929–2019), Dutch politician
 Frans Anneessens (1660–1719), Flemish protest leader
 Frans van Anraat (born 1942), Dutch businessman and convicted war criminal
 Frans Badens (fl. 1571–1618), Flemish painter
 Frans Bak (born 1958), Danish composer, choral conductor, saxophonist, and pianist
 Frans Decker (1684–1751), 18th-century painter from the Northern Netherlands
 Frans-Andries Durlet (1816–1867), Belgian architect, sculptor and printmaker
 Frans Fiolet (born 1939), Dutch field hockey player
 Frans Floris (1517–1570), Flemish painter
 Frans Christiaan Frederiks (born 1980), Dutch rapper and hip hop artist Lange Frans
 Frans Geurtsen (1942–2015), Dutch footballer
 Frans Gommers (1917–1996), Belgian footballer
 Frans Grootjans (1922–1999), Belgian politician and minister for the PVV
 Frans Hals (1580–1666), Dutch painter
 Frans Helmerson (born 1945), Swedish cellist, pedagogue, and conductor
 Frans Hogenberg (1535–1590), Flemish and German painter, engraver, and mapmaker
 Frans Hogenbirk (1918–1998), Dutch football midfielder
 Frans Alfons Janssens (1865–1924), Belgian priest and biologist
 Frans Lanting (born 1951), Dutch wildlife photographer and writer
 Frans August Larson (1870–1957), Swedish missionary to Mongolia
 Frans Maassen (born 1965), Dutch cyclist
 Frans Masereel (1889–1972), Belgian woodcut artist
 Frans Muller (born 1960/61), Dutch businessman
 Frans Alfred Meeng (1910–1944), Dutch-Indonesian footballer
 Frans Dhia Putros (born 1993), Danish professional football player
 Frans Anatolius Sjöström (1840–1885), Finnish architect
 Frans Stafleu (1921–1997), Dutch botanist
 François Steyn (born 1987), South African rugby player (called "Frans")
 Frans Thijssen (born 1952), Dutch football player
 Frans Timmermans (politician) (born 1961), Dutch politician
 Frans de Vreng (1898–1974), Dutch track cyclist
 Frans de Waal (born 1948), Dutch primatologist
 Frans Wackers (born 1939), Dutch nuclear cardiologist
 Frans Jeppsson Wall (born 1998), Swedish singer (also known as Frans)

Nickname
 Frans Bauer (born 1973), Dutch singer
 Francois Botha (born 1968), South African boxer and kickboxer
 Fran Escribá (born 1965), Spanish football player and manager
 Frans Harjawiyata (1931–2016), Indonesian Roman Catholic Trappist abbot
 Frans van Houten (born 1960), CEO of the Dutch company Philips
 Frans Kellendonk (1951–1990), Dutch novelist and translator
 Frans van der Lugt (1938–2014), Dutch Jesuit priest
 Frans Seda (1926–2009), Indonesian government minister in several departments
 Frans Xavery (1740–c. 1788), Dutch painter

Surname
 Frédéric Frans (born 1989), Belgian footballer
 Jeffrey Frans (born 1952), South African cricketer
 Joe Frans (born 1975), Canadian curler
 Joe Frans (politician) (born 1963), Swedish politician

Fictional characters
 Frans J. Palmu, main character of the Palmu novels and film adaptations

See also
 
 Fransen
 Franz (given name)

Dutch masculine given names
Lists of people by nickname
Hypocorisms